Elena Fomicheva (born April 11, 1987) is a classical pianist, soloist and accompanist.

Education

Russian-born pianist Elena Fomicheva started her piano studies at the age of six in St. Petersburg. In 2006 Elena graduated with her bachelor's degree from Modest Mussorgsky College of Music and 6 years later received an Artist Diploma in Piano performance from Rimsky-Korsakov State Conservatory in Saint Petersburg. In 2012 she moved to Boston, USA where she pursued her studies and graduated with Master of Music Degree in 2014.

Career
Already during her studies had received numerous awards, among others the 2006 First Prize in Collaborative Arts Competition at  the Mussorgsky Music College, the 2010 Grand Prix for the best soloist with orchestra of Russian Folk Instruments "The Carousel Orchestra" in Prague and various awards at various competitions for young talents in Gatchina, Tikhvin, St. Petersburg, Moscow, Russia and Narva, Estonia.
Had started performing early and among her noted performances are her 2005 tour with the St. Petersburg Students Orchestra throughout Europe, performing as a soloist and with the Orchestra in Finland, Sweden, Denmark, Germany and winning the First 
- a three months long series of soloist at gala concerts in Egypt in 2009;
- highly acclaimed recitals with the noted American pianist/violinist Ayke Agus (the former Jascha Heifetz assistant) in Los Angeles in 2010; 
- recital by special invitation at the 2011 Jascha Heifetz documentary premiere "God's Fiddler" in Russia - recital with Ayke Agus  at the House of Composers, St. Petersburg; 
- by special invitation at the 2011 Jascha Heifetz documentary premiere "God's Fiddler" in Lithuania - recital with Ayke Agus in Vilnius; 
- by special invitation at the 2011 Jascha Heifetz documentary premiere in USA – recital with Ayke Agus in New-York. 
Following the success of the latter recitals, Elena Fomicheva was invited by Ayke Agus to form a permanent duo for concerts throughout Europe and the United States.The duo won the hearts of audience by the exquisite interpretations of Heifetz’s transcriptions for violin and piano.

Ms. Fomicheva's artistic activity includes appearances in such well-known venues as Glazunov Hall and Glinka Capella in Saint Petersburg, Rudolfinum Concert Hall in Prague, Mozarteum University in Salzburg, Philharmonic Hall in Vilnius, Merkin Hall, Steinway Hall in New York City, and Jordan Hall in Boston, among others. She participated in master classes with Graham Johnson, Craig Rutenberg, Allan Smith, Ayke Agus, Richard Goode, Alexander Braginsky, Glenn Dicterow, Baruch Meir, Boris Slutsky, Marian Hann and Ulrich Eisenlohr.

Recently Elena became a Recipient of the 2014 Marc and Eva Stern Tuition Fellowship at SongFest at Colburn School of Music in Los Angeles, CA. In August 2014 Ms. Fomicheva received an Outstanding Collaborative Pianist Award at the 43rd AIMS Vocal and Piano Institute in Graz, Austria.

References

External links

 Modest Mussorgsky Music College, St. Petersburg
 Rimsky-Korsakov State Conservatory, St. Petersburg

1987 births
Living people